USS SC-498 was a SC-497 class submarine chaser that served in the United States Navy, and later the Free French Navy, during World War II.

She was laid down as PC-498 on 12 March 1941 by the Westergard Boat Works in Rockport, Texas, and launched on 21 July 1941.  She was commissioned as USS PC-498 on 29 April 1942.  She was later reclassified a SC-497 class submarine chaser and renamed SC-498.

She was transferred to the Free French Navy as part of the Lend-Lease program on 18 March 1944 as CH-142, and was later reclassified as P-696.  Her exact fate is unknown.

See also
 Harbour Defence Motor Launch
 Wooden boats of World War II

References

Motor Gunboat/Patrol Gunboat Photo Archive: SC-498

SC-497-class submarine chasers
Ships built in Texas
1941 ships
SC-497-class submarine chasers of the French Navy
Ships of the Free French Naval Forces